Jorge Alejandro Villavicencio Álvarez (1958 – 20 July 2020) was a Guatemalan surgeon and politician. He was Minister of Public Health and Social Assistance from 2 May 2012 to 24 September 2014 during the Otto Pérez Molina presidency. 

In 2019, Villavicencio was arrested and sent to a private military prison over corruption accusations. The charges including giving public work contracts to those commissioners benefitting him and also creating fake job positions in the Ministry while he was in charge.

Villavicencio died of COVID-19 during the COVID-19 pandemic in Guatemala at a hospital in Guatemala City on 20 July 2020, aged 62.

References

1958 births
2020 deaths
Guatemalan civil servants
Guatemalan surgeons
Universidad de San Carlos de Guatemala alumni
Deaths from the COVID-19 pandemic in Guatemala
21st-century Guatemalan politicians
Government ministers of Guatemala